Paul Blaisdell (July 21, 1927 – July 10, 1983) was an American painter, sculptor and visual effects creator, best remembered for his work in science fiction and horror B movies of the 1950s.

Life and career 
Blaisdell was born in Newport, Rhode Island in 1927, and grew up in Quincy, Massachusetts. He sketched and built models since early childhood, and eventually attended the New England School of Art and Design in Boston. Following his graduation, he married his wife Jackie and they moved to California, where he worked for Douglas Aircraft; on the side, he drew artwork for various science fiction magazines, eventually meeting noted literary agent - and founding creative director/editor of the long-running monster magazine Famous Monsters of Filmland - Forrest J Ackerman, who ended up becoming his agent. (Ackerman ran a feature article on Blaisdell in issue #1 of his magazine, but after Blaisdell had a major disagreement with the publisher James Warren, Ackerman was told not to promote Blaisdell in any future issues of "FM".)

In 1955, Blaisdell was hired to create the creature effects for Roger Corman's low-budget film The Beast with a Million Eyes, after which he spent several years designing the monsters for a number of B movies, earning a reputation for working quickly and cheaply. In many cases, he was also the actor playing the title creature on screen (see filmography below).

However, after a few years, he became disenchanted with the business. Most of the costumes and props he created were allowed to decay in the 1950s due to poor storage conditions. Forrest J. Ackerman had the monster prop from Beast With a Million Eyes carelessly stored in direct sunlight in his home until it completely dried up and fell apart. The three-eyed mutant costume from Day the World Ended was pretty much ripped to pieces by fans when it was displayed at several promotional tours. The masks for Cat Girl, Saucer Men and It Conquered the World were all destroyed in the flaming finale of How to Make a Monster. The only costume that survived until 1959 was his She-Creature suit, before AIP forced him to alter the costume so it could be re-used in 1959's Ghost of Dragstrip Hollow, to the point where he felt it just wasn't the same costume any more (the female breasts were removed among other things). What was left of it was destroyed in a Southern California flood that hit Paul Blaisdell's house in 1979.

In the early 1960s, Blaisdell submitted some monster designs for projected films such as Goliath and the Dragon (1960) and Jack the Giant Killer (1962), but they weren't used (he was still paid for his time however). Producer James Nicholson tried to involve Blaisdell in two planned AIP TV series (Beyond the Barriers of Space and Out of This World), but the shows never got made.

In the 1960s Blaisdell, together with film editor/archivist/actor Bob Burns III, formed the company Black Shield, to publish the "Famous Monsters"-inspired magazine Fantastic Monsters Of The Films for seven issues during 1962-63, for which Jim Harmon and Ron Haydock edited and wrote text. He gave up on the magazine when the plates for the eighth issue were destroyed in a fire at his printers. He later heard that the printer purposely burned his shop to collect insurance fraudulently, and a large part of Bob Burns' still and lobby card collection went up in the flames. Eventually, Blaisdell quit all involvement in the movie industry to work as a carpenter instead, and became something of a hermit from then on. In 1965, he inherited some property from his mother which he was able to rent to tenants, and thereby supplement his income. Bob Burns III and he remained best friends all their lives.

In 1979, Fangoria Magazine ran a detailed, two-part interview with him, followed soon after by a similar retrospective in Cinefantastique. Filmmaker Fred Olen Ray tried to hire Blaisdell to work on the effects in his 1979 film Alien Dead, but Blaisdell was too ill to work at that point.

Blaisdell suffered from severe dental problems in later life, and finally died of cancer at the age of 55 in Topanga, California in 1983, around the time that the home video market of the 1980s was beginning to resurrect fan interest in his 1950s films. Not one Hollywood newspaper ran his obituary.

A model kit company called Billikin put out several kits in the late 1980s based on some of Blaisdell's creature creations, including the monsters from It Conquered the World, The She-Creature and Invasion of the Saucer Men. (Later, a rival company produced a model kit based on the mutant in Day the World Ended as well.) AIP's Sam Arkoff received a share of whatever profit was made on these kits, but sadly Blaisdell's widow got nothing.

Filmography

Effects 
(Unless noted, Blaisdell created the monster costume in each film)
 The Beast with a Million Eyes (1955) 
 Day the World Ended (1955) 
 It Conquered the World (1956, uncredited)
 The She-Creature (1956, uncredited)
 Voodoo Woman (1957, uncredited) (costume from She-Creature re-used)
 Not of This Earth (1957, uncredited)
 The Amazing Colossal Man (1957) (created the tiny-sized props)
 Cat Girl (1957, uncredited) (created the Cat Girl mask used only in the U.S. prints)
 From Hell It Came (1957, uncredited)
 Monster from Green Hell (1957) (submitted monster sketches, but was not hired to create the monster suit)
 Invasion of the Saucer Men (1957)
 Attack of the Puppet People (1958, uncredited) (created the giant-sized props & Dr. Jekyll costume)
 War of the Colossal Beast (1958) (tiny-sized props from Amazing Colossal Man re-used)
 Earth vs. the Spider (1958) aka The Spider (designed the two corpses and the giant spider leg)
 How to Make a Monster (1958 film) (1958) (mask from She-Creature and Saucer Men re-used)
 It! The Terror from Beyond Space (1958)
 Teenagers from Outer Space (released in 1959) (designed the ray guns and the film's poster)
 Invisible Invaders (1959) (costume from "It!" re-used)
 The Ghost of Dragstrip Hollow (1959) (costume from She-Creature re-used)

Acting 
 Day the World Ended (1955) played the creature
 Oklahoma Woman (1956) played one of Peggy Castle's henchmen
 Hot Rod Girl (1956) cameo, played the near-miss victim
 It Conquered the World (1956) played the creature
 The She-Creature (1956) played the creature
 Voodoo Woman (1957) played the creature as well as a drunk in the bar scene
 The Undead (1957) played a corpse in a coffin
 Dragstrip Girl (1957) cameo
 Sorority Girl (1957) cameo
 Motorcycle Gang (1957) cameo
 Invasion of the Saucer Men (1957) played one of the aliens
 The Ghost of Dragstrip Hollow (1959) (played the monster and "himself")

References

External links

https://ourculturemag.com/2017/09/02/tribute-paul-blaisdell/

American designers
Special effects people
1927 births
1983 deaths
Artists from Newport, Rhode Island
People from Topanga, California